Haji Mohammad Usman Turabi (حاجی محمد عثمان ترابی) is an Afghan politician and member of the Taliban. Usman served as Governor of Kunar province from August 2021 to 20 September 2021 and was replaced by Maulvi Muhammad Qasim.

References

Year of birth missing (living people)
Living people
Taliban governors
Governors of Kunar Province
Place of birth missing (living people)